Impala is the second album by Songs: Ohia. It was released in 1998 via Happy-Go-Lucky and Secretly Canadian.

Critical reception
AllMusic called Impala "a lovely, peeling, chipped record of emotional decay." Tucson Weekly deemed it "spare, organ-based melancholy pop."

Track listing
All songs written by Jason Molina.
"An Ace Unable to Change" (Gambling Song) – 7:45
"Easts Heart Divided" (45 Degrees) – 2:13
"This Time Anything Finite at All" (Trans Am) – 3:58
"Hearts Newly Arrived" (Revellie) – 3:32
"Till Morning Reputations" (Travel) – 2:52
"One of Those Uncertain Hands" (Anchors) – 1:17
"A Humble Cause Again" (Bath) – 2:08
"The Rules of Absence" (Spaniel) – 2:24
"Just What Can Last" (All Friends Leave You) – 4:34
"Program: The Mask" (Angel Anthem) – 2:15
"Structuring: Necessity" (The Eagle) – 2:44
"Separations: Reminder" (Sept. 17) – 2:46
"Program and Disjunction" (Ours the Armada) – 3:10

Recording information
 Jason Molina
 Geof Comings (Party Girls)

References

External links
 Secretly Canadian press release

1998 albums
Jason Molina albums
Secretly Canadian albums